The Safety Institute of Australia Ltd is Australia's peak body for the occupational health & safety profession. Established more than 60 years ago, the Institute has a membership of over 4,000 individuals and more than 50 Corporate Members. In many cases, Members of the Safety Institute of Australia (SIA) are actively working in the field of OHS as Health and Safety Representatives, or OHS practitioners or professionals. Other Members simply have an interest in health and safety in the workplace.

History of the Safety Institute of Australia 

The SIA was founded by a small group of students who enrolled in and attended the first Industrial Safety and Accident Prevention course conducted by Melbourne Technical College in 1948. Graduates from this course were awarded a Certificate of Industrial Safety and Accident Prevention. After completing the course, the group of students collaborated to form the nucleus of the Safety Engineering Society of Australia, and held regular monthly meetings. The founding members of what was then known as the Safety Engineering Society of Australia included Eric Warburton (the first President), Chris Allan (the first Secretary), Eugene Falk (Secretary), Harold Greenwood-Thomas, Bill Reid, Bill Jenkins, Peter Cathcart, Bill Carroll and Cecil Holmes.

Membership of the Society expanded steadily in the early years of its existence, reaching a point where eventually every state had formed a division, affiliated with the federal body. In general, membership included a majority of safety engineers and safety officers, as well as medical practitioners, insurance officers, occupational nurses, educators and other people interested in promoting health, safety and accident/harm prevention.

With time, it became apparent that the term “Safety Engineering” in the society's name had an implied bias and emphasised only one of the many disciplines associated with the effective control of accidents, injuries and diseases. As a result, the Safety Institute of Australia was incorporated in 1977 with
a new constitution, and members of the society became members of the new SIA. Some of the notable people who carried forward the aims and objectives of the society at that time were Eric Wigglesworth, Samuel Barclay, Sol Freedman, Frank Kuffer, Roger Smith, Cip Corva, Hilton Ludekens and Fred Catlin.

In 1977, the SIA joined with the (then) South Melbourne Technical School in establishing a specialist resource collection in the field of industrial safety and health. This library became the most comprehensive research resource available for safety professionals and was maintained by Institute Members for many years.

In 1981, the SIA played a major role in launching the Ballarat College of Advanced Education’s Occupational Hazard Management course, the first tertiary level (Graduate Diploma) course of its kind. Since that time, the SIA has successfully promoted and supported a wide range of undergraduate, graduate and postgraduate educational courses around Australia, and today the Australian OHS Education Accreditation Board (AOHSEAB) continues this work.

Through its early decades, the SIA ran many events and conferences for its Members. In September 1987, this accelerated when the Institute joined with the International Commission on Occupational Health and ran the 22nd International Congress on Occupational Health in Sydney, Australia, titled Work for Health. The program offered 288 oral presentations and 178 poster presentations, selected from 760 abstracts submitted by a variety of professional persons with an interest in the science of safety and injury prevention. Since that time, the Institute has run nearly 100 state and national conferences and continues to provide an active conference program including state and territory events and a national annual safety convention, which brings together the wider health and safety community.

During the period 1958 to the present day, the Institute has maintained a close working relationship with the Australian Standards Organisation (now known as Standards Australia). The Institute has served on many Technical Committees dealing with, among others, Risk Management, Fire Safety, Occupational Health and Safety, Road and Traffic Design, the Building Code of Australia. SIA Members have represented Australian Standards while attending conferences and working parties with the International Standards Organisation in Geneva, Switzerland and the European Standards Organisation, Brussels, Belgium. Today, the SIA has
representatives on 15 Standards Committees.

The SIA also has a long history in working with regulators, employers, unions and government departments in the pursuit of more effective health and safety policy and regulation. Over the decades, branches of the SIA have often had very strong links to the regulators within their state or territory, engaging in shared activities and projects which reflect the common interests that the Institute shares with these bodies.

The Institute has also engaged actively over the years with employer and union groups, and was originally a Member of the National Occupational Health and Safety Committee (NOHSC) – the precursor to Safe Work Australia. Since that time, the SIA retains ongoing links with Safe Work Australia.

Professional associations based in Australia
Workplace health and safety in Australia